Jan Matthys (also known as Jan Matthias, Johann Mathyszoon, Jan Mattijs, Jan Matthijszoon; c. 1500 – 5 April 1534) was a charismatic Anabaptist leader of the Münster Rebellion, regarded by his followers as a prophet.

Matthys was born in Haarlem, in the Holy Roman Empire's County of Holland, where he worked as a baker, and was converted to Anabaptism through the ministry of Melchior Hoffman in the 1520s. Matthys baptized thousands of converts, and after Hoffman's imprisonment, rose to prominent leadership among the Anabaptists. Matthys rejected the pacifism and non-violence theology of Hoffman, adopting a view that oppression must be met with resistance.

In 1534, an Anabaptist insurrection took control of Münster, the capital city of the Holy Roman Empire's Prince-Bishopric of Münster. John of Leiden, a Dutch Anabaptist disciple of Matthys, and a group of local merchants summoned Matthys to come. Matthys identified Münster as the "New Jerusalem", and on January 5, 1534, a number of his disciples entered the city and introduced adult baptism. Reformer Bernhard Rothmann apparently accepted "rebaptism" that day, and well over 1000 adults were soon baptized.

They declared war on Franz von Waldeck, its expelled prince-bishop, who besieged the fortified town of Münster. In April 1534, on Easter Sunday, Matthys, who had prophesied that God's judgment on the wicked would take place on that day, attacked with twelve followers, under the idea that he was a second Gideon, and was cut off with his entire band. He was killed, dismembered and his head stuck on a pike. Later that evening, his genitals were nailed to the city door.

Notes
  Jan Matthijsz van Haarlem (d. 1534) at Global Anabaptist Mennonite Encyclopedia Online

Year of birth unknown
Year of birth uncertain
1534 deaths
16th-century apocalypticists
Converts to Anabaptism
Dutch Anabaptists
Military personnel killed in action
Clergy from Amsterdam
 People from Münster